Black rice, also known as purple rice or forbidden rice, is a range of rice types of the species Oryza sativa, some of which are glutinous rice.

There are several varieties of black rice available today. These include Indonesian black rice, Philippine heirloom balatinaw black rice and pirurutong black glutinous rice, and Thai jasmine black rice. Black rice is known as chak-hao in Manipur, India.

In Bangladesh, it is known as kalo dhaner chaal (black paddy rice) and used to make polao or rice-based desserts. The bran hull (outermost layer) of black rice contains one of the highest levels of anthocyanins found in food. The grain has a similar amount of fiber to brown rice and like brown rice, has a mild, nutty taste.

Black rice has a deep black color and usually turns deep purple when cooked. Its dark purple color is primarily due to its anthocyanin content, which is higher by weight than that of other colored grains. It is suitable for creating porridge, dessert, traditional Chinese black rice cake, bread, and noodles.

See also
 Wild rice
 Riceberry
 Arròs negre

References

Rice varieties